Sofie Andersson Aagaard (born 6 June 1983) is a Swedish professional golfer who played mainly on the United States-based Futures Tour. She competed on tour as Sofie Andersson, adding Aagaard after her marriage in November 2012.

As an amateur, Andersson represented the Swedish National Team from 1999 to 2006. In 2004, she captured Sweden's first World Amateur Team Championships gold medal at the competition in Puerto Rico with Karin Sjödin and Louise Stahle. Two years later at the same event held in South Africa, she won the silver medal together with Anna Nordqvist and Caroline Westrup. She made her debut on the Ladies European Tour at the 2005 Scandinavian TPC hosted by Annika where she missed the cut.

Andersson began her college career as a freshman at Mississippi State University, earning SEC second-team all-conference honors before transferring to University of California, Berkeley in 2003, where she was a three-time NCAA Division I All-American and a member of the team finishing in the top five at the NCAA Championships three years in a row 2004 to 2006. Andersson finished her career with a school-record 74.2 average and was a two-time All-West Region honoree and twice earned All-Pac-10 Conference second-team accolades in 2005 and 2006, in addition to All-Pac-10 honorable mention praise in 2004. Her highest NCAA finish was sixth place in 2004, and in 2005 she captured the Spartan Invitational individual title, as part of a total of 16 individual top-10 finishes.

Andersson turned professional in 2007 and joined the 2007 Duramed Futures Tour (later renamed Symetra Tour), the second-tier women's professional golf tour in the United States and is the "official developmental tour" of the LPGA Tour. During her rookie year she had her first professional career win, the Aurora Health Care Championship at Lake Geneva, Wisconsin. After three other top ten finishes she ended the season 16th on the money list. She lost the 2009 Michelob Ultra Duramed Futures Players Championship in a playoff with Mina Harigae, who won on the first hole of a playoff.

Andersson competed in the 2010 U.S. Women's Open (Oakmont) and the 2011 U.S. Women's Open (Broadmoor).

In 2015 Andersson was appointed head coach of women's golf at California Polytechnic State University.

Professional wins

Symetra Tour (1)

Symetra Tour playoff record (0–1)

Team appearances
Amateur
Espirito Santo Trophy (representing Sweden): 2004 (winners), 2006
European Ladies' Team Championship (representing Sweden): 2003, 2005

References

External links

Swedish female golfers
Mississippi State Lady Bulldogs golfers
California Golden Bears women's golfers
LPGA Tour golfers
Ladies European Tour golfers
Cal Poly Mustangs women's golf coaches
Sportspeople from Skåne County
People from Ängelholm Municipality
People from San Luis Obispo, California
1983 births
Living people
21st-century Swedish women